Hendrik Sirringhaus (born 6 February 1985 in Hemer, North Rhine-Westphalia) is a German ice hockey goaltender who currently plays for EHC Netphen of the German Oberliga. He previously played with Herner EV and in the Deutsche Eishockey Liga with the Iserlohn Roosters. He joined the first-tier team at the age of 18 and served as the team's third-choice goalie.

External links

References 

1985 births
Living people
People from Hemer
Sportspeople from Arnsberg (region)
German ice hockey goaltenders
Iserlohn Roosters players